The list of shipwrecks in April 1830 includes ships sunk, foundered, grounded, or otherwise lost during April 1830.

1 April

2 April

4 April

6 April

8 April

9 April

10 April

11 April

12 April

15 April

16 April

17 April

18 April

20 April

22 April

23 April

24 April

25 April

27 April

30 April

Unknown date

References

1830-04